A list of films produced in the United Kingdom in 1952 (see 1952 in film):

See also
 1952 in British music
 1952 in British television
 1952 in the United Kingdom

References

External links

1952
Films
Lists of 1952 films by country or language